John Downes may refer to:

John Downes (regicide) (1609–c. 1666), English commissioner convicted of regicide of Charles I of England at the restoration of Charles II
John Downes (prompter) (died c. 1712), English theatre prompter for most of the Restoration period, 1660–1700
John Downes (naval officer) (1786–1854), American Commodore and ship captain in the United States Navy
John Downes, Rear admiral in the United States Navy during World War II
John Downes (sailor) (1870–1943), British Olympic sailing gold medalist in 1908
John Downes (runner), Irish athlete at the 1996 IAAF World Cross Country Championships – Senior men's race
John K. Downes (1879–1944), Canadian politician, member of the Legislative Assembly of Manitoba, 1922–1927

See also
John Downs (disambiguation)